Elm Branch is a stream in Clark and Scotland counties in the U.S. state of Missouri. It is a tributary of the Wyaconda River.

Elm Branch was named for the elm timber along its course.

See also
List of rivers of Missouri

References

Rivers of Clark County, Missouri
Rivers of Scotland County, Missouri
Rivers of Missouri